The Plateau is the central business district of Abidjan, the economic capital of Côte d'Ivoire. It is one of the 10 urban communes of the city. The Plateau is surrounded by the municipality of Yopougon to the west, to the south by the Ébrié Lagoon. As a central business district, it brings together most of the city's administrative and commercial activities. Most of the large Ivorian firms have their headquarters in Plateau. It also has a very lively market.

Nicknamed by some the "Little Paris" or "Little Manhattan", the Plateau with its towers and buildings overlooks the Ébrié Lagoon. Since the creation of the railway district, to accommodate the terminus of the Abidjan-Niger railway line, the Plateau has rapidly developed to become the administrative, commercial and financial center of Côte d'Ivoire, and holds an important place in West Africa.

There is also the Félix Houphouët-Boigny stadium and the cathédrale Saint-Paul.

One of its amazing features is to welcome thousands of bats after dark, which gather above the lagoon to hunt mosquitoes and other insects.

Architecture 
The commune of Plateau has many office towers, hosts of ministries and several companies. Its architecture varies between modernism, for certain monuments such as the cathédrale Saint-Paul or the Presidential Palace and several other buildings, and functionalism, for the majority of buildings. The Plateau is a model of town planning typical of the 1960s and 70s.

References

Communes of Abidjan